Uma Sharma (born 1942) is a kathak dancer, choreographer and teacher. She is also runs the Bharatiya Sangeet Sadan, Delhi, a classical dance and music academy, situated in New Delhi, founded by her father in 1946. She is most known for reviving the old classical dance form of Natwari Nritya or the Raslila of Brindavan, which later evolved into the Kathak.

Kathak is based on devotional Krishna poetry of the medieval centuries and the highly cultivated court poetry of the 18th and 19th centuries which celebrated shringara, the sentiment of love.

Early life and training
Uma Sharma's family hails from Dholpur in Rajasthan. Born in Delhi in 1942, Uma Sharma received her dance training from Guru Hiralalji and Girvar Dayal of the Jaipur gharana, and subsequently she became a student of Pandit Sunder Prasad of the Jaipur gharana who emphasised rhythmic footwork and its permutations. Shambhu Maharaj and Birju Maharaj noted gurus of the Kathak tradition of the Lucknow gharana, known for the art of abhinaya, subsequently Uma Sharma sought to achieve a creative fusion of the two.
Uma went to St. Thomas' School (New Delhi) for schooling, and then graduated from Lady Shri Ram College for Women, also in New Delhi.

Career
After having learnt the presentation of traditional items, she has widened the repertoire of Kathak by composing new dance numbers and full length dance-dramas on a variety of themes. Her dance drama Stree (Woman), has been known its powerful thematic content and artistic presentation. As a one-woman exposition Stree Kathak gives emotive thrust in depicting the position of Woman down the centuries and her search for an independent identity.

Uma has performed all over the country and participated in many a national and international festivals. She has been on performance tours to USSR, New Zealand, Australia, USA, Canada, Middle East, Japan and China, both on invitation from organizations abroad and as a representative of the Department of Culture and the Indian Council for Cultural Relations.

Uma Sharma runs her own School of Music and Dance in the capital and has trained a whole new generation of younger dancers.

However, veteran dance critic and scholar Sunil Kothari of New Delhi, has criticized her dance as always being very Bollywood oriented in nature. He has also accused her of misusing her connections with various government officials to gain awards and publicity. Uma hasn't commented on such allegations.

Awards
In 1973 she became the youngest dancer be conferred upon with the Padma Shri by Government of India, and Padma Bhushan 2001. She was awarded the Sangeet Natak Akademi Award and also the Sahitya Kala Parishad Award. On 27 January 2013, she was honoured with title Srijan Manishi by Akhil Bhartiya Vikram Parishad, Kashi for her great contribution to Indian Kathak Dance.

Notes

References

External links
 Uma Sharma Website

Kathak exponents
1942 births
Living people
Dancers from Delhi
Recipients of the Sangeet Natak Akademi Award
Recipients of the Padma Shri in arts
Recipients of the Padma Bhushan in arts
Lady Shri Ram College alumni
Indian female classical dancers
Performers of Indian classical dance
Indian dance teachers
Indian classical choreographers
Dance education in India
Teachers of Indian classical dance
Indian women choreographers
Indian choreographers
Women educators from Delhi
20th-century Indian dancers
20th-century Indian educators
Educators from Delhi
20th-century Indian women artists
20th-century women educators